Gert Hauske (born 1940) is a German engineer and Emeritus Associate Professor at the Institute for Communications Engineering, Technische Universität München, known for his work in the field of vision research, especially his work on a system theory of visual perception.

Biography 
Hauske took his studied in Germany and the United States, where he graduated under Gerald Westheimer at the University of California, Berkeley. In 1975 he published one of his first articles with Westheimer, entitled "Temporal and spatial interference with vernier acuity."

After graduation he was appointed Professor of Communications Engineering at the Technische Universität München in its Institut für Nachrichtentechnik. Among his students was Eckhard D. Falkenberg. He participated in the Deutsche Gesellschaft für Kybernetik and edited the proceedings of its 6th Congress held at Munich, March 30 - April 1, 1977.

Hauskes research interests are in the field of modelling visual perception in relation its detection and localization, and the processing, storing and compressing image data.

Selected publications 
 Hans Marko, Gert Hauske, Albrecht Struppler. Processing Structures for Perception and Action: Final Report of the Sonderforschungsbereich "Kybernetik" 1969 - 1983. Wiley, 15 nov. 1988.
 Rolf Eckmiller, Georg Hartmann, Gert Hauske (eds.), Parallel processing in neural systems and computers. 1990
 Gert Hauske. Systemtheorie der visuellen Wahrnehmung, Springer-Verlag, 2017

 Articles
 Westheimer, Gerald, and Gert Hauske. "Temporal and spatial interference with vernier acuity." Vision Research 15.10 (1975): 1137-1141.
 Lupp, Uwe, Gert Hauske, and Werner Wolf. "Perceptual latencies to sinusoidal gratings." Vision Research 16.9 (1976): 969-972.
 Krieger, G., Rentschler, I., Hauske, G., Schill, K., & Zetzsche, C. (2000). "Object and scene analysis by saccadic eye-movements: an investigation with higher-order statistics." Spatial Vision, 13(2), 201-214.

 Patents
  Computation of subjective video quality, EP 1763248 A1, 2007

References

External links 
 Prof. (i. R.) Dr.-Ing. Gert Hauske at Institute for Communications Engineering, Technische Universität München

1940 births
Living people
Engineers from Munich
Cyberneticists
Academic staff of the Technical University of Munich